The 2018 Pan American Table Tennis Championships were held in Santiago, Chile from 20 to 25 November 2018.

Medal summary

Events

Medal table

Results

Men's singles

Finals

Section 1

Section 2

Section 3

Section 4

Women's singles

Finals

Section 1

Section 2

Section 3

Section 4

Men's doubles

Women's doubles

Mixed doubles

Finals

Top Draw

Bottom Draw

See also
2018 ITTF Pan-America Cup

References

Pan American Table Tennis Championships
Pan American Table Tennis Championships
Pan American Table Tennis Championships
Sport in Santiago
Table tennis competitions in Chile
International sports competitions hosted by Chile
Pan American Table Tennis Championships